USS Sunnadin may refer to the following ships of the United States Navy:

  a  serving from 1919 to 1946
  a  serving from 1945 to 1969

United States Navy ship names